George Noble may refer to:
 George Noble (politician) (1891–1949), Australian member of the New South Wales Legislative Assembly
 George Noble (engraver), English line-engraver
 George Bernard Noble (1892–1972), American scholar